Kevin Michael Patrick Higgins (20 February 1951 – 5 July 2019) was an Australian rules footballer who played for Geelong and Fitzroy in the Victorian Football League (VFL) during the 1970s.

Career 

Kevin Higgins, who played 128 games for the Cats and 25 for Fitzroy in the VFL, became an icon on the local Geelong football scene during the 1980s after guiding GFL club, Newtown & Chilwell to its only GFL premierships in 1982, 1985 and 1986.

Recruited from Bendigo League club Sandhurst, Higgins debuted in the opening round of 1970 in the Cats’ nine-point win over Hawthorn at Glenferrie Oval.

Higgins started his career as a forward but it was as a defender he made his name at Kardinia Park. A left-footer, Higgins was a regular in the team from 1973 and made his finals debut in 1976. He was Geelong's best-placed player at the 1978 Brownlow Medal count. He departed Geelong at the end of 1978.  

Higgins transferred to Fitzroy in 1979 and appeared in all 24 games that year, two of them finals.
However, his only appearance in 1980 – Fitzroy’s Round 2 loss to Melbourne – would prove to be his last game at the VFL level, just before his 30th birthday.

Higgins was appointed as playing coach of the Newtown and Chilwell Football Club, Eagles, in late 1980 as they prepared for their third season in the fledgling GFL competition.

Playing at full-forward, he kicked 100 goals twice in a season (1981 & 1982) and was the [Geelong Football League|GFL] leading goal-kicker in 1982. Newtown & Chilwell finished runner-up to North Shore in 1981 and then went on to defeat reigning GDFL Division 1 premier St Peter’s in 1982.

The Eagles then made three straight Grand Final appearances between 1985-87, winning the first two deciders and falling just short of a hat-trick of flags when beaten by St Albans by 22 points despite having two more scoring shots.

Higgins’ final season in charge at Elderslie Reserve came in 1988, leaving him with an impressive 106-49 win-loss record from 155 games.

He was appointed coach of SANFL club Sturt in 1990 but only lasted only one season with the Double Blues after they could manage just two wins on their way to the wooden spoon.

Kevin Higgins was a dedicated educator with a passion for teaching and learning. He was the youngest Catholic School Principal appointed in Victoria when he took the role at the newly opened Mercia Primary School in 1976.  In his later years, he was dedicated to the work of the Cotton On Foundation and their support for education programs in Uganda, Thailand and South Africa.

Higgins died on 5 July 2019. The next day, his former team Geelong wore black tape around their arms as a tribute to Higgins during a match against the Western Bulldogs.

References

Holmesby, Russell and Main, Jim (2007). The Encyclopedia of AFL Footballers. 7th ed. Melbourne: Bas Publishing.

1951 births
2019 deaths
Geelong Football Club players
Fitzroy Football Club players
Sturt Football Club coaches
Sandhurst Football Club players
Newtown & Chilwell Football Club players
Australian rules footballers from Victoria (Australia)